Nowiny  is a village in the administrative district of Gmina Przytoczna, within Międzyrzecz County, Lubusz Voivodeship, in western Poland.

The village had a population of 70 in 2008.

References

Nowiny